Neoschmidia (sometimes spelt Neoschmidea) is a genus of shrubs in the family Rutaceae.  The genus is  endemic to New Caledonia in the Pacific and contains two species.

List of species
Neoschmidia calycina
Neoschmidia pallida

References

Endemic flora of New Caledonia
Zanthoxyloideae
Rutaceae genera